The Roman Catholic Archdiocese of Hyderabad is an archdiocese located in the city of Hyderabad in India.

History
 1851: Established as the Apostolic Vicariate of Hyderabad from the Apostolic Vicariate of Madras
 1 September 1886: Promoted as the Diocese of Hyderabad
 19 September 1953: Promoted as the Metropolitan Archdiocese of Hyderabad

Leadership
 Archbishops of Hyderabad 
 Anthony Poola (19 November 2020 - present)
 Thumma Bala (12 March 2011 - 2020)
 Marampudi Joji (29 January 2000 – 27 August 2010)
 Samineni Arulappa (6 December 1971 – 29 January 2000)
 Joseph Mark Gopu (19 September 1953 – 28 February 1971)
 Bishops of Hyderabad 
 Joseph Mark Gopu (later Archbishop) (8 January 1953 – 19 September 1953)
 Alphonsus Beretta, P.I.M.E. (23 December 1950 – 8 January 1953)
 Dionigi Vismara (11 May 1909 – 19 February 1948)
 Pierre-André Viganò, P.I.M.E. (25 October 1897 – 11 May 1909)
 Vicars Apostolic of Hyderabad
 Daniel Murphy (later Archbishop) (20 May 1851 – 14 November 1865)

Suffragan dioceses
 Adilabad 
 Cuddapah
 Khammam
 Kurnool
 Nalgonda
 Warangal

References

External links
 GCatholic.org 
 Catholic Hierarchy 

 Catholic Encyclopedia: Diocese of Hyderabad-Deccan

Roman Catholic dioceses in India
Christianity in Telangana
Religious organizations established in 1851
Roman Catholic dioceses and prelatures established in the 19th century
1851 establishments in India
Religion in Hyderabad, India